The Lavistown Loop Line provides an important function in transporting freight and timber liner trains on the Dublin–Waterford line. Before the loop was constructed, freight and timber liner trains would have to turn around at Kilkenny railway station to continue on to their destination in Sallypark, near . Approval for construction was given by Minister Brian Cowen on 2 December 1994. Non-passenger trains such as the "DFDS Freight Train" from – avoid Kilkenny by using the Lavistown Loop Line which joins both lines going to Kilkenny. The loop has allowed Irish Rail to run a daily morning limited stop service between Waterford and Heuston departing Waterford at 07.10 and arriving Heuston at 09.01.

References 

Iarnród Éireann
Railway lines opened in 1994
Transport in County Kilkenny